The Hotel Perla de Cuba in Havana was the first commercial hotel in Cuba, it was situated on the corner of Dragones and Amistad in the municipality of Centro Habana.

Gallery

See also

 Neoclassical architecture
 Royal Palm Hotel (Havana)
 Plaza del Vapor, Havana
 Havana Plan Piloto
 El Capitolio

Notes

References

Buildings and structures in Havana
Neoclassical architecture in Cuba
Architecture in Havana